Live at Biko is a live album by American singer-songwriter Mark Kozelek. It was released on July 1, 2014, through Kozelek's own record label Caldo Verde Records.

The album was recorded on April 6, 2014 in Biko Club in Milano, Italy. It features live renditions of Sun Kil Moon tracks, as well as selections from Kozelek's respective 2013 collaborative albums with Jimmy LaValle and Desertshore, Perils from the Sea (2013) and Mark Kozelek & Desertshore (2013). The tracks "I Love My Dad" and "Tavoris Cloud" were recorded on April 4, 2014 at Circolo Degli Artisti in Rome, Italy.

Critical reception

Upon its release, Live at Biko received positive reviews from music critics. At Metacritic, which assigns a normalized rating out of 100 to reviews from critics, the album received an average score of 80, which indicates "generally favorable reviews", based on 6 reviews. Dan Caffrey of Consequence of Sound wrote: "If you’re a Kozelek disciple, the songs on Live at Biko won’t give you further insight into the love, lust, humor, and sadness that make him tick, but the dialogue sure will." Paste magazine critic Mack Hayden stated that the album is "as communal as a set of campfire songs, complete with humor, screw-ups and familiarity."

Stuart Berman of Pitchfork noted: "Live at Biko is quick to remind us that Benji is as much a comedy as tragedy, at times forcefully so." PopMatters critic John Paul praised Kozelek's lyrics and storytelling, writing: "Thoroughly exhausting, but highly rewarding, Kozelek’s recent work is some of the most rewarding of his career, Live at Biko proving no exception."

Track listing

Personnel
 Mark Kozelek – performance, production, photography
 Nathan Winter – mixing
 Et Cetera – graphic design

References

External links
 

2014 live albums
Mark Kozelek albums
Caldo Verde Records albums
Albums produced by Mark Kozelek